Ilford is a town in London, England.

Ilford may also refer to:

Places

Australia
 Ilford, New South Wales, a small town in Australia

Canada
 Ilford, Manitoba, a community in the Canadian province of Manitoba

United Kingdom
 Ilford in Redbridge, London
 Ilford North (UK Parliament constituency)
 Ilford South (UK Parliament constituency)
 Municipal Borough of Ilford, a historic district in Essex, England
 Iford, East Sussex, a village and civil parish in the Lewes District of East Sussex
 Ilford, Somerset, a hamlet in the civil parish of Ilton in Somerset
 Little Ilford in Newham, London
 Ilford Road station on the Tyne and Wear Metro
 Ilford Park Polish Home in Devon

Other uses
 Geoffrey Hutchinson, Baron Ilford, a British soldier, a barrister and Conservative Party politician
 Ilford Photo, a photographic company

See also
 Iford (disambiguation)